Speed climbing competitions at the 2021 IFSC Climbing World Cup are being held at two locations, from 28 May to 3 July 2021. The International Federation of Sport Climbing had originally scheduled six speed climbing events concluding on 31 October, but COVID-19 travel restrictions resulted in the cancellation of events in Xiamen and Wujiang in China, Jakarta in Indonesia and Seoul in South Korea.

The top three in each competition received medals, and at the end of the season, the overall winners were awarded trophies. The overall winners were determined based upon points, which athletes were awarded for finishing in the top 30 of each individual event.

Overview

Records broken

Competition format 
The speed wall is standardized: 15 meters high, 5 degrees overhanging, same route.

In the qualifications, athletes race in both lane a and lane b; only their best times are recorded and used for seeding. Sixteen fastest athletes in the qualifications progress into the finals where athletes are seeded and raced head-to-head against.each other.

Overall ranking 
The overall ranking is determined based upon points, which athletes are awarded for finishing in the top 30 of each individual event. There are four competitions in the season. The national ranking is the sum of the points of that country's three best male and female athletes. Results displayed (in brackets) are not counted.

Men 
The results of the ten most successful athletes of the Speed World Cup 2021:

Women 
The results of the ten most successful athletes of the Speed World Cup 2021:

* = Joint place with another athlete

National Teams 
The results of the ten most successful countries of the Speed World Cup 2021:

Country names as used by the IFSC

Salt Lake City, United States (May, 28–30)

Men 
38 men attended the event.

Kiromal Katibin of Indonesia set a world record time of 5.258 seconds in qualifying, a record that was broken the same day by fellow Indonesian, Veddriq Leonardo, who hit the buzzer at 5.20 in the final run against Katibin. Poland's Marcin Dzieński placed third after beating American John Brosler in the small final.

Women 
24 women attended the event.

Poland's Aleksandra Mirosław took the win after winning a tight race against the United States' Emma Hunt who took second place. A non-speed-specialist Japan's Miho Nonaka placed third after beating Poland's Patrycja Chudziak in the small final.

Villars, Switzerland (July, 1–3)

Men 
51 men attended the event.

Indonesia's Veddriq Leonardo claimed his second consecutive win after beating Russia's Dmitrii Timofeev in the final race. Leonardo's teammate, Kiromal Katibin placed third after beating Russia's Vladislav Deulin in the small final.

Women 
40 women attended the event.

Russia's Ekaterina Barashchuk took her first World Cup gold medal after outracing her teammate and current world record holder Iuliia Kaplina in the final race. Poland's Patrycja Chudziak took third place after beating Indonesia's Desak Made Rita Kusuma Dewi in the small final.

References 

IFSC Climbing World Cup
2021 in sport climbing